The 1955 Cleveland Browns season was the team's sixth season with the National Football League. The Browns' defense became the first defense in the history of the NFL to lead the league in fewest points allowed and fewest total yards allowed for two consecutive seasons.

The defending NFL champion Browns were 9–2–1 in the regular season and won the Eastern Conference. They played in the NFL Championship Game for the sixth consecutive year, and repeated as champion with a 38–14 win over the Rams in Los Angeles.

Season summary
The 1955 season began in rough fashion for the Browns, with the defending world champions losing 27–17 at home in the opener to the Washington Redskins, who had their best season in a decade by finishing second in the Eastern Conference at 8–4. But once hall of fame quarterback Otto Graham got back on track, so did the Browns. With Graham, who had been lured out of retirement when the team experienced problems at that position in training camp, leading the way, the Browns then went on to win six in a row and nine of their last 11 to finish 9–2–1 and capture their sixth consecutive conference title. The Browns then blasted the host Los Angeles Rams 38–14 in the league title game, after which Graham retired again – this time for good, ending the club's remarkable first decade of existence in which it played in the league championship contest all 10 times and won seven crowns.

The Browns really caught fire offensively in the last five games. Including the title contest, they averaged 37.8 points per outing during that span, in which they won four times and played to a 35–35 tie with the New York Giants. Also, earlier in the year, they won the important road rematch with the Redskins, 24–14.

On the season, Graham threw for 15 touchdowns with just eight interceptions for a 94.0 quarterback rating, the second-best mark of his six-year NFL career. The Browns had three receivers with 29 or more catches, combining for 18 TDs. Pete Brewster was tops in receptions with 34, with Ray Renfro leading the way in scores with eight. Also, the Browns had something they hadn't had since their first year in the NFL—that is, a big-yardage running back. Fred "Curly" Morrison rushed for 824 yards, the most by a Brown since the team joined the league in 1950, when hall of famer Marion Motley had 810 yards.

Roster

Exhibition schedule

Regular season

Schedule

Note: Intra-division opponents are in bold text.

Standings

NFL Championship Game

 Monday, 1 pm PST

Awards and records
Led NFL, Points Scored (349)

References

External links
 1955 Cleveland Browns at Pro Football Reference (Profootballreference.com0
 1955 Cleveland Browns at jt-sw.com 
 1955 Cleveland Browns Schedule at jt-sw.com
 1955 Cleveland Browns at DatabaseFootball.com  

Cleveland
Cleveland Browns seasons
National Football League championship seasons
Cleveland Browns